Hoyt Taylor may refer to:
Hoyt Patrick Taylor (1890–1964), Lieutenant Governor of North Carolina
Hoyt Patrick Taylor Jr. (1924–2018), known as "Pat" Taylor, his son
Albert H. Taylor (1879–1961), American electrical engineer; radar developer
 (born 1953), American actor